A sulfinyl nitrene is a chemical compound with generic formula R-S(O)N, with oxygen and nitrogen both bonded to the sulfur atom.

Preparation
Sulfinyl nitrenes can be generated from the unstable sulfinyl azides (R-SON3). However this reaction easily results in explosions and unpredictable results.

Sulfinyl nitrenes can be prepared from a sulfinylhydroxylamine, with R–O–N=S=O, by a reaction with an organometallic M-R1 compound to yield R1SON.

Properties
Sulfinyl nitrenes are electrophilic.

Sulfinyl nitrenes have a resonance structure between sulfur in a +6 oxidation state and a triple bond to nitrogen, or sulfur with a +4 state, nitrogen in +1 state and a single bond, or a positive charge on sulfur and a negative charge on nitrogen with a double bond. The dominant state is the singlet state with charge separation and a double bond.

Reactions
Sulfinyl nitrenes are unstable and react with themselves to yield sulfonyl nitrenes, disulfides or polymerise to trioxotrithiztriazes.

The reaction with water yields a sulfonylamide (R-SO2NH2.

The reaction of a sulfinyl nitrene with sulfoxides results in a sulfonyl sulfoximde, with the oxygen joining the sulfinyl sulfur and its bond replaced by a double bond to nitrogen.

Examples
Trifluoromethyl sulfinyl nitrene (CF3S(O)N) has been produced as a gas, and isolated in a noble gas matrix.

Methoxysulfinyl nitrene (CH3OS(O)N) was also produced by decomposing the azide.

Related
Sulfinyl nitrenes are distinct from sulfonyl nitrenes which have two oxygen atoms attached to the sulfur atom.

Thiazate or thionylimide ([NSO]−) is an anion that exists as alkali metal salts. They can be formed by a tri-tert-butoxy metal reaction with a trimethylsilyl compound:

KOtBu + Me3SiNSO → K[NSO] + Me3SiOtBu

NaNSO, KNSO, RbNSO, CsNSO, (Me2N)3S+NSO− and tris(dimethylamino)sulfonium [(Me2N)3S][NSO] salts are known.

References

Sulfur compounds
Nitrogen compounds
Oxygen compounds